This is a list of the gymnasts who represented their country at the 1988 Summer Olympics in Seoul from 17 September to 2 October 1988. Gymnasts across two disciplines (artistic gymnastics and rhythmic gymnastics) participated in the Games.

Female artistic gymnasts

Male artistic gymnasts

Rhythmic gymnasts

References 

Lists of gymnasts
Gymnastics at the 1988 Summer Olympics